Mount Clare may refer to:

 Mount Clare (Maryland), historic house (1763) in Baltimore, Maryland, USA
 Mount Clare (Roehampton), historic house (1773) in Roehampton, south west London
 Mount Clare Shops, historic railroad complex founded by Baltimore and Ohio Railroad
 Mount Clare Station, a former railroad station in Baltimore which is now part of the B&O Railroad Museum
 Mount Clare, Illinois
 Mount Clare, Nebraska
 Mount Clare, West Virginia

See also 
 Montclair (disambiguation)
 Mont Clare (disambiguation)